Eremias przewalskii , commonly known as the Gobi racerunner, is a species of lizard in the family Lacertidae. The species is endemic to Asia.

Etymology
The specific name, przewalskii, is in honor of Russian explorer and naturalist Nikolai Mikhailovitch Prjevalsky.

Geographic range
E. przewalskii is found in China, Kyrgyzstan, Mongolia, and Russia.

Habitat

Reproduction
E. przewalskii is viviparous.

References

Further reading
Bischoff W, Schmidtler JF (2013). "Nikolai Michailowitsch Przewalski und “sein” Wüstenrenner Eremias przewalskii (Strauch, 1876)". Die Eidechse 24 (3): 90-95. (in German).
Boulenger GA (1887). Catalogue of the Lizards in the British Museum (Natural History). Second Edition. Volume III. Lacertidæ ... London: Trustees of the British Museum (Natural History). (Taylor and Francis, printers). xii + 575 pp. + Plates I-XL. (Eremias przewalskii, pp. 105-106).
Strauch A (1876). "[Reptiles]". In: Przewalski NM (1876). [Mongolia and the Tangut Country. A Three-year Travel in Eastern High Asia ]. Volumes I & 2. St. Petersburg, Russia: [Imperial Russian Geographic Society]. (Podarces przewalskii, new species, p. 43 + Plate VII). (in Russian).

Eremias
Reptiles described in 1876
Taxa named by Alexander Strauch
Reptiles of Russia